Katherine Uchida (born 8 November 1999) is a Canadian rhythmic gymnast.

Uchida participated in the Pacific Rim Gymnastics Championships in 2014, where she won a silver medal in the team event and in 2016 where she won a silver medal in the team event and a bronze medal in the individual all-around.

She won a silver medal at the 2018 Commonwealth Games in the individual all-around event. She also won two silver medals at the 2019 Pan American Games in the ball and hoop events.

References

1999 births
Living people
Gymnasts from Toronto
Canadian rhythmic gymnasts
Commonwealth Games medallists in gymnastics
Commonwealth Games silver medallists for Canada
Gymnasts at the 2018 Commonwealth Games
Pan American Games medalists in gymnastics
Pan American Games silver medalists for Canada
Gymnasts at the 2019 Pan American Games
Medalists at the 2019 Pan American Games
21st-century Canadian women
Medallists at the 2018 Commonwealth Games